TC Business School (TCBS) is a company located in Prague, Czech Republic, offering the MBA and MBA Basics course.

About company and courses
The course is more focused on practical skills, projects and teamwork. Familiarisation with an MBA in a unique MBA Basics course, with a certificate for completion. Courses are held in the Czech Republic. The company also offers consultancy services. There is a unique service called "workshop" (Seminář in Czech), which is free. There the attendants can see how the MBA course works.

External links
 TCBS website (English)
 TCBS website (Czech)
 TCBS - MBA - MBA course on TC Business School (Czech).

Educational institutions in Prague
Business schools in the Czech Republic
Companies based in Prague
1992 establishments in Czechoslovakia
Educational institutions established in 1992